Ebor is a village on Waterfall Way on the Northern Tablelands in New South Wales, Australia.

History
The village is situated in the traditional lands of the Gumbaynggirr peoples.

Ebor shares its name with a nearby set of waterfalls, Ebor Falls, which is a local tourist attraction.

Borderlands
Although "The Heart of Waterfall Way", Ebor is on the eastern edge of Armidale Regional Council, and close to the border of Clarence Valley Council and Bellingen Shire Council. Until the amalgamation of Guyra and Armidale councils, one side of Ebor was under Armidale council, and the other under Guyra shire. Likewise, Ebor is close to three state (Northern Tablelands, Oxley and Clarence) and three  federal electoral boundaries (New England, Cowper and Page).

Facilities
Amenities in the area include a cafe, a combined post office, fuel station and general store, a pub/motel with camp ground, and a NSW DEC primary school. The local sports ground is home of the Ebor Campdraft.

There are also Rural Fire Service and National Parks and Wildlife Service depots in the area, but no police or ambulance services based in Ebor. The nearest hospital and 24h emergency department is in Dorrigo.

Features
Due to its central position on Waterfall Way, Ebor offers easy access for residents and tourists to Guy Fawkes River National Park, Cathedral Rock National Park, Cunnawarra National Park, New England National Park, part of Oxley Wild Rivers National Park, Nymboi-Binderay National Park and Mount Hyland Nature Reserve.

The natural environment of the surrounding district includes some areas which have been cleared for pastoralism and forestry. Nonetheless, the national parks around Ebor have been described as a bush walking "Mecca". The main tourist attraction is the twin Ebor Falls.

In 1930 Sydney Smith Jr. wrote that: "During a recent visit to Ebor I was much impressed with the possibilities of this part of the State as a tourist resort... Around Ebor and Guy Fawkes can be seen some of the most magnificent scenery in this State if not Australia. ...The two falls are scenes of beauty, and in winter time are sometimes frozen, making a beautiful spectacle as they hang in huge icicles. The water from the Ebor eventually finds an outlet in the Clarence River. ...The view, ...as regards expansiveness, ruggedness, and beauty, must compare more than favourably with views of a similar nature in any part of the Commonwealth. It reminded me of the Valley of a Thousand Hills, outside Durban, in South Africa".

In 1976, local historian Eric Fahey also wrote: "I believe the future of Dorrigo will depend largely on tourism. The area has a lot to offer, both in peerless scenery and because of the native fauna which can be seen in large numbers in their natural state."

Wagyu beef specialists Stone Axe have a large holding, "Glen Alvie", on the northern boundary of the village. Stone Axe also acquired "Alfreda" in the nearby locality of Wongwibinda.

Black truffles (tuber melanosporum) are grown at the Guy Fawkes Truffle Company outside of Ebor on the Guyra Rd.

Trout are another local product. The Dutton Trout Hatchery on Point Lookout Road was established in 1950 and is one of the largest hatcheries in the state. Visitors can see the various stages of trout development prior to their release in the mountain streams.  The release of trout into local streams is believed to have led to decline of the endangered Tusked frog.

There are two short walks close to the village. One takes walkers through the  recreation reserve. This walk follows the Guy Fawkes River upstream for about half of the walk. Some bird life can be seen. The second walk is accessed by crossing the Guy Fawkes River bridge, and following the pedestrian path that winds downstream under the bridge. This path follows the Guy Fawkes River north and meets the national park's Upper and Lower Falls paths. Wallabies, kangaroos, bird life and fire-flies can be seen depending on the season. Platypus have also been sighted in August in the pool above the falls.

The Bicentennial National Trail (BNT) passes through Ebor, which sits on the boundary of sections 7 and 8 of the BNT.

The Ebor Falls area is sometimes used for rock climbing, and is described as "holding a rather special place in the History of New England climbing".

Speeding and traffic
Ebor has a noted problem with speeding vehicles. Both passenger cars and heavy vehicles regularly exceed the posted speed limit of 50 km/h. Traffic noise is also a problem. Waterfall Way has an entry on the Dangerous Roads website.

Post office
Ebor's Post Office opened on 2 March 1868, closed in 1869 and reopened in 1910. It is currently located at the Ebor petrol station/store having moved from Fusspots Cafe.

Cultural heritage
Ebor has a number of cultural heritage sites, including several Aboriginal meeting places, and massacre sites.

"Gwenda Gardens" is an abandoned homestead on the Guyra-Ebor Road.

Other sites include:
 Waterfall Way: Yooroonah Tank Barrier
 Former Cottage Hospital at 5 Parke Street
 Ebor Cemetery off Waterfall Way
 Deconsecrated Union Church at 11608 Waterfall Way
 Former Ebor Soldiers Hall at 11626 Waterfall Way
 Former Australian Bank of Commerce (formerly City Bank of Sydney) at 27 Ebor Street
 Homestead, “Milamba” (including original Guy Fawkes Post Office and sheep dip) at 7122 Grafton Road 
 House, “Kotupna” at 7314 Grafton Road
 Cement weir at 337 Point Lookout Road

Climate
The village of Ebor is at high altitude  by Australian standards. It has cold winters with frequent overnight frost and occasional light snow falls.

References

External links
 Ebor General Cemetery
 

 
Towns in New South Wales
Towns in New England (New South Wales)